Marcelo Bastos Ferreria (born 26 September 1965) is a Brazilian sailor and Olympic champion. He received a gold medal in the Star Class at the 1996 Summer Olympics in Atlanta with Torben Grael. He received a bronze medal at the 2000 Summer Olympics in Sydney, and won a gold medal at the 2004 Summer Olympics in Athens.

Ferreira is World champion from 1990 and 1997, and seven times Brazilian champion (1989, 1996, 1998, 2000, 2001, 2002 and 2003).

In 2005-06, he was a crewmember on Brasil 1 in the Volvo Ocean Race.

Notes

References

External links
 
 
 

1965 births
Living people
Brazilian male sailors (sport)
Olympic sailors of Brazil
Olympic gold medalists for Brazil
Olympic bronze medalists for Brazil
Olympic medalists in sailing
Sailors at the 1992 Summer Olympics – Star
Sailors at the 1996 Summer Olympics – Star
Sailors at the 2000 Summer Olympics – Star
Sailors at the 2004 Summer Olympics – Star
Medalists at the 2004 Summer Olympics
Medalists at the 2000 Summer Olympics
Medalists at the 1996 Summer Olympics
Star class world champions
Volvo Ocean Race sailors
World champions in sailing for Brazil
Sportspeople from Niterói